The Paralia was a geographical and administrative region (trittys) of ancient Attica.

The term designated the coasts of Attica, but was also generally used for the entire portion of Attica east of Mount Hymettus.

In the Classical period, the paralia comprised about 40 settlements (demoi).

References

Geography of ancient Attica